Andrei Vladimirovich Dyatel (born 8 January 1980) is a Russian former professional football player.

Club career
He made his debut in the Russian Premier League in 2001 for FC Dynamo Moscow. He played 2 games in the UEFA Cup 2001–02 for FC Dynamo Moscow.

References

1980 births
Footballers from Moscow
Living people
Russian footballers
Russia under-21 international footballers
Association football midfielders
Russian expatriate footballers
Expatriate footballers in Belgium
K.R.C. Zuid-West-Vlaanderen players
FC Dynamo Moscow players
FC Shinnik Yaroslavl players
FC Torpedo Moscow players
Russian Premier League players
FC Avangard Kursk players
FC Spartak Nizhny Novgorod players